"Oh No" is an R&B ballad from the 1981 Commodores album In the Pocket.  Written by Lionel Richie, the song was released as a single in 1981, being his last hit with the Commodores before going solo.

Similarities of the song's opening bars can be heard in Richie's 1981 duet "Endless Love" with Diana Ross.

Record World praised "the combination of delicate piano melodies and Lionel Richie Jr.'s emotional lead vocal."

This song was also featured in the 1982 movie The Last American Virgin.

Track listings
7" single
"Oh No"  – 3:00
"Lovin' You"  – 4:36

Charts

References

1981 singles
Commodores songs
Songs written by Lionel Richie
1981 songs
Motown singles
Song recordings produced by James Anthony Carmichael